The State Administration of Foreign Exchange (SAFE) of the People's Republic of China is an administrative agency under the State Council tasked with drafting rules and regulations governing foreign exchange market activities, and managing the state foreign-exchange reserves, which at the end of December 2016 stood at $3.01 trillion for the People's Bank of China. The current director is Pan Gongsheng.

Role 
SAFE's existence and role were initially closely guarded secrets, its subsidiaries were minor, but the funds under management have increased significantly in recent years. They were responsible for running SAFE's portfolio across the various time zones, replicating the investments of head office in Beijing.

SAFE created and  controlled the Central Huijin Investment, but in September 2007, it ceded control to the newly formed sovereign wealth fund, China Investment Corporation.

With the burgeoning of China's reserves and amidst increasing rivalry between state agencies, there are signs of growing independence of and competition between the subsidiaries.

Management 
The current Administrator of SAFE is Yi Gang, Deng Xianhong, Fang Shangpu, Wang Xiaoyi, Li Chao are Deputy Administrators.

Structure
SAFE Head Office
General Affairs Department (Policy and Regulation Department)
Balance of Payments Department
Current Account Management Department
Capital Account Management Department
Supervision and Inspection Department
Reserves Management Department
Human Resources Department (Internal Auditing Department)
Science and Technology Department
Institutions affiliated with the SAFE
Central Foreign Exchange Business Center
Information Center
General Services Center
Editorial Office of the Foreign Exchange of China journal.
 Major overseas investment entities of SAFE
 SAFE Investment Company Limited (华安投资有限公司), registered in Hong Kong, China, on June 2, 1997
 Investment Company of the People's Republic of China (华新投资有限公司), registered in Singapore, on September 10, 2008
 Gingko Tree Investment LTD (华欧投资有限公司), registered in London, United Kingdom, on December 11, 2009,
 Beryl Datura Investment Limited, registered in British Virgin Islands, 2012
Trading room in Frankfurt (法兰克福交易室), registered in Frankfurt, Germany, 2012

Functions 
 drafting laws, standards, policies and reform of the forex administration system
 risk management and monitoring of balance of payments and the external credit and external debt
 development and supervision of the foreign exchange market,
 setting Renminbi convertibility / exchange rate policy
 operations and management of foreign exchange reserves, gold reserves, and other foreign exchange assets of the state.
 regulating Cryptocurrency

Investments
The magnitude of China's reserves is disclosed, but not its composition. At the end of 2006, approximately 70 percent of the reserves were in U.S. dollar assets, 20 per cent in euros and 10 per cent in other currencies, according to economist Brad Setser. Most of China's currency reserves are invested in high grade U.S.-dollar-denominated debt, such as U.S. Treasuries, though as early as 2007 it was estimated that SAFE held $100 billion worth of U.S. mortgage-backed securities, hoping to achieve higher returns than those on U.S. Treasuries.

"The Hong Kong subsidiary is notably taking more risk in managing reserves," according to an informed source. The Financial Times reported on 4 January 2008 that the Hong Kong branch had bought stakes of less than 1 percent in both Commonwealth Bank of Australia and Australia and New Zealand Banking Group, respectively Australia's second and third-biggest lender by assets, over the preceding two months. The ANZ purchase has been confirmed by the bank. SAFE also invested in BP and Total in April 2008.

2008 diversification and losses
As the reserves continue to grow, the central bank is aiming to boost investment returns on its foreign-exchange holdings by making somewhat riskier but higher-yielding investments. Pronouncements of Chinese officials are consequently closely scrutinised; each trade is reportedly up to US$1 billion. As part of diversification in 2008, SAFE acquired small stakes in dozens of companies including British companies Rio Tinto, Royal Dutch Shell, BP, Barclays, Tesco and RBS.

Brad Setser, speaking in March 2009 said losses as a result of this diversification at the peak of the market "would exceed US$80bn."

Brad Setser said:"SAFE has built up one of the largest US equity portfolios of any foreign government entity investing abroad, including the major sovereign wealth funds....It appears SAFE began diversifying into equities early in 2007 and, rather than being deterred by the subprime crisis, it continued to buy."

2009 investment policy
On March 23, 2009, deputy governor of China's central bank, Hu Xiaolian told reporter:"China will continue investing in U.S.  government bonds while paying close attention to possible fluctuations in the  value of those assets.... Investing in U.S. Treasury bonds is an important component of China's  foreign currency reserve investments..."
,''

Branches
SAFE has branches and offices in all provinces, autonomous regions and municipalities. As of 2005, it had 36 branch offices, 298 central sub-branches and 508 sub-branches.

It has branches in Hong Kong, Singapore, London and New York.

The Hong Kong office (华安公司 SAFE Investment Company Ltd) was set up just in June 1997, before the transfer of sovereignty of Hong Kong, and served an important role in defending the value of the Renminbi and Hong Kong dollar's peg to the US dollar against international speculators. It was a minor outpost for SAFE for several years, with only about $20bn in funds under management.

See also 
 Foreign-exchange reserves
 Foreign exchange reserves of China
 List of countries by foreign exchange reserves

References

External links 
 State Administration of Foreign Exchange Official site 
 China’s Dollar Trap

1978 establishments in China
Foreign trade of China
Government agencies established in 1978
Government agencies of China
Organizations based in Beijing
People's Bank of China
Sovereign wealth funds